The fixation reflex is that concerned with attracting the eye on a peripheral object. For example, when a light shines in the periphery, the eyes shift gaze on it.  It is controlled by the occipital lobe of the cerebral cortex, corroborated by three main tests:

 Removal of cortex causes shutdown of this reflex
 Drawing a figure on the cortex surface will cause eye movements in the direction traveled
 Detecting an image by recording the actual signals from the eyes

Older research declares that a motor pathway from the occipital cortex to the brainstem motor neurons was via the superior colliculi.  This is the case in lower animals, but in humans, the theory that eye-muscle nuclei aside from the superior colliculi of the midbrain is now generally held.

When an object is focused directly at an object but the eyes drift off their target, the fixation reflex keeps the eyes focused on the original object, albeit moving itself.

See also
Nystagmus
Saccade

Bibliography
"eye, human."Encyclopædia Britannica. 2008. Encyclopædia Britannica 2006 Ultimate Reference Suite DVD

Reflexes
Vision